Klaus Michael Grüber (4 June 1941 - 22 June 2008) was a German theatre director and actor.
As an actor, he played Hans in Les Amants du Pont-Neuf.

Awards
Konrad Wolf Prize (2000)

References

External links
 

1941 births
2008 deaths
German theatre directors